Chuck Moore may refer to:

 Charles H. Moore (born 1938), inventor of the Forth programming language
 Charles R. Moore (computer engineer) (1961–2012), computer architect
 Chuck Moore (American football) (born 1940), former American football offensive lineman